is a train station located in Yanagawa, Fukuoka, Japan.

Lines 
Nishi-Nippon Railroad
Tenjin Ōmuta Line

Platforms

Adjacent stations

Surrounding area

 Takahatake Nursery
 Yakabe Elementary School
 Hollywood World Beauty College
 Miyajitake Shrine
 Yanagawagokoku Shrine
 Shinto Shrine
 Mos Burger
 Yanagawa Hoshiko Clinic
 Japan National Route 208

Railway stations in Fukuoka Prefecture
Railway stations in Japan opened in 1937